Plerandra is a genus of flowering plants in the family Araliaceae that has long been considered a synonym of Schefflera, which has been a polyphyletic group.

Species
Species include:
 Plerandra actinostigma (A.C. Sm. & B.C. Stone) G. M. Plunkett, Lowry & Frodin
 Plerandra baillonii (R. Vig.) Lowry, G. M. Plunkett & Frodin
 Plerandra bakeriana (Seem.) A.C. Sm.
 Plerandra brassii Philipson
 Plerandra cabalionii (Lowry) Lowry, G. M. Plunkett & Frodin
 Plerandra calcicola Lowry & G. M. Plunkett ined.
 Plerandra costata (A.C. Sm.) G. M. Plunkett, Lowry & Frodin
 Plerandra crassipes (Baill.) Lowry, G. M. Plunkett & Frodin
 Plerandra elegantissima (Veitch ex Mast.) Lowry, G. M. Plunkett & Frodin
 Plerandra elongata (Baill.) Lowry, G. M. Plunkett & Frodin
 Plerandra emiliana (Baill.) Lowry, G. M. Plunkett & Frodin
 Plerandra gabriellae (Baill.) Lowry, G. M. Plunkett & Frodin
 Plerandra gordonii Lowry, G. M. Plunkett & Frodin ined.
 Plerandra graeffei Dammann
 Plerandra grandiflora A.C. Sm.
 Plerandra grayi Seem.
 Plerandra hogkugu Harms
 Plerandra insolita A.C. Sm.
 Plerandra jatrophifolia Hance
 Plerandra leptophylla (Veitch ex T. Moore) Lowry, G. M. Plunkett & Frodin
 Plerandra letocartiorum Lowry & G. M. Plunkett ined.
 Plerandra longistyla Lowry, G. M. Plunkett & Frodin
 Plerandra mackeei Lowry & G. M. Plunkett ined.
 Plerandra memaoyaensis Lowry & G. M. Plunkett ined.
 Plerandra micrantha Philipson
 Plerandra moratiana Lowry & G. M. Plunkett ined.
 Plerandra neocaledonica Lowry, G. M. Plunkett & Frodin
 Plerandra nono (Baill.) Lowry, G. M. Plunkett & Frodin
 Plerandra osyana (Veitch ex Regel) Lowry, G. M. Plunkett & Frodin
 Plerandra pachyphylla (Harms) Lowry, G. M. Plunkett & Frodin
 Plerandra pancheri (Baill.) Lowry, G. M. Plunkett & Frodin
 Plerandra paucidens (Miq.) Baill.
 Plerandra paucidentata Baill.
 Plerandra pickeringii A. Gray
 Plerandra plerandroides (R. Vig.) Lowry, G. M. Plunkett & Frodin
 Plerandra polydactylis (Montr.) Lowry, G. M. Plunkett & Frodin
 Plerandra pouemboutensis Lowry & G. M. Plunkett
 Plerandra reginae (hort. ex W. Richards) Lowry, G. M. Plunkett & Frodin
 Plerandra seemanniana (A.C. Sm.) G. M. Plunkett, Lowry & Frodin
 Plerandra solomonensis Philipson
 Plerandra stahliana Warb.
 Plerandra tannae (A.C. Sm. & B.C. Stone) G. M. Plunkett, Lowry & Frodin
 Plerandra taomensis Lowry, G. M. Plunkett & Frodin ined.
 Plerandra toto Lowry & G. M. Plunkett
 Plerandra tronchetii Lowry & G. M. Plunkett ined.
 Plerandra vanuatua (Lowry) Lowry, G. M. Plunkett & Frodin
 Plerandra veilloniorum Lowry, G. M. Plunkett & Frodin
 Plerandra veitchii (hort. ex Carrière) Lowry, G. M. Plunkett & Frodin
 Plerandra victoriae Gibbs
 Plerandra vitiensis (Seem.) Baill.

References

 
Apiales genera